Michael Gino Panepinto (born November 17, 1965 in Buffalo, New York) is a former professional American football running back in the National Football League. He attended Canisius College. He played with the Buffalo Bills in 1987.

References

External links
Pro-Football Reference

1965 births
Living people
Players of American football from Buffalo, New York
Buffalo Bills players
Canisius College alumni
Canisius Golden Griffins football players
National Football League replacement players